Alcohol dehydrogenase 4 is an enzyme that in humans is encoded by the ADH4 gene.

This gene encodes class II alcohol dehydrogenase 4 pi subunit, which is a member of the alcohol dehydrogenase family. Members of this enzyme family metabolize a wide variety of substrates, including ethanol, retinol, other aliphatic alcohols, hydroxysteroids, and lipid peroxidation products. Class II alcohol dehydrogenase is a homodimer composed of 2 pi subunits. It exhibits a high activity for oxidation of long-chain aliphatic alcohols and aromatic alcohols and is less sensitive to pyrazole. This gene is localized to chromosome 4 in the cluster of alcohol dehydrogenase genes.

References

Further reading

External links